KAWW (1370 AM, "News Talk 1370") is a radio station licensed to serve Heber Springs, Arkansas, United States. The station, established in 1967, is owned by Crain Media Group, LLC.

KAWW broadcasts a news/talk format.

The station was most recently assigned the KAWW call sign by the Federal Communications Commission on October 3, 2000.

References

External links
Crain Media Group official website

AWW
News and talk radio stations in the United States
Sports radio stations in the United States
Cleburne County, Arkansas
Radio stations established in 1967
AWW
1967 establishments in Arkansas